Majak Daw (born 11 March 1991) is a former Australian rules footballer who played for the North Melbourne Football Club and the Melbourne Football Club in the Australian Football League (AFL). Daw and his family in Australia are refugees from the civil wars in Sudan. Daw became the first Sudanese Australian to be drafted to an AFL club when he was contracted to North Melbourne in the 2009 AFL Draft. Daw's drafting gained international attention; it was reported by the BBC and the Voice of America. He made his first appearance for North Melbourne in a NAB Cup match on 20 February 2011.

Early life
Daw was born in Khartoum, Sudan, the third of his parents' eventual seven children. His family fled the Second Sudanese Civil War, living in Egypt for three years, then moved to Australia in 2003.

TAC Cup years
Playing for the Western Jets Daw was identified as a future key-position player by North Melbourne and the Western Bulldogs.
Daw went to the 2009 Victorian Screening portion of the AFL pre-draft testing. He impressed with a 13.6 in the beep test and 3.03 seconds in a 20-metre sprint along with a standing jump of 70 centimetres. He was one of 11 young Australian rules footballers to be given 2010 Mike Fitzpatrick Scholarships awarded by the AFL Players Association and accepted the awards on behalf of the other players.

AFL career

Draft to North Melbourne
Daw was picked up with the ninth pick in the 2010 rookie draft. His draft pick gained international media attention. His career at North Melbourne began with playing for VFL club Werribee, where he continued to develop his game. He made his first appearance for North Melbourne in a pre-season NAB cup match against the Western Bulldogs on 20 February 2011. In April 2011, playing for Werribee, Daw kicked an impressive running goal from beyond 50 m out, prompting calls for his inclusion to the senior team.

VFL racism incident
On 4 June 2011, Majak Daw was racially abused by a Port Melbourne Football Club supporter while he was playing for the Werribee Tigers in the VFL. Daw stated that it "made [him] feel really small". The man has since been banned from all VFL games until he completes an anti-racism workshop and formally apologises to Daw for the slur. The incident has led to renewed calls to stamp out racism in sport, with former Victorian Premier Ted Baillieu calling Daw a hero.

Suspension from North Melbourne senior team
Daw was suspended from North Melbourne Football Club in February 2012 and remanded to the Werribee Tigers for an indefinite period for lying to the club and coach Brad Scott about a "night on the town" during a period in which he was recovering from knee surgery.

AFL debut
In 2013, Daw had an excellent showing in the 2013 NAB Cup, which prompted calls for his inclusion in the Senior Side. When tall forward Robbie Tarrant went down with a thigh injury, Daw was brought in to replace him and make his debut in Round 4 against the Brisbane Lions. In the first minute of the game, Daw marked the ball inside 50, and kicked his first AFL goal with his first AFL kick. However, his debut ended on a sour note when he collided with teammate Ben Cunnington and suffered a concussion before quarter time, and he took no further part in the game. North went on to win the game by 63 points.

Daw held his spot and played the next week, scoring no goals but three behinds against Hawthorn. In Round 7 against the Western Bulldogs, Majak had a breakout performance in just his fourth career game, kicking a game-high 6 goals in North's 54-point win. After the match, North Melbourne coach Brad Scott said of Majak: "'Maj' is a good example of what you can do with really hard work. Hard work trumps talent any day of the week."

2015–present

He was delisted in October 2015; however, he was re-drafted in the 2016 rookie draft.

In 2016, Majak Daw won mark of the year after taking a specky against Collingwood. Majak played the most games in a season in his career at that point with nine in addition to playing in his first final, which was in the elimination final against  and kicking four goals despite North Melbourne losing 141–79.

In 2017, after having a season full of injuries and only managing to play seven games in total, at the end of the 2017 AFL season Daw eyed more versatility as an AFL player.

In the 2018 offseason, Daw changed his position from a forward to a defender. Daw sought this change as he thought it was his last chance at thriving in the AFL. Majak played his first game as a defender against  in the AFLX series. Later on in round 3 against , Daw officially played his first game as a defender.

Daw was recruited to the Melbourne Demons football club in 2021, playing at VFL-level all that season.

Daw struggled with injury during his time at Melbourne and did not play a senior game for them before announcing his retirement in June 2022.

Statistics
Statistics are correct to the end of round 12, 2022

|- style="background:#EAEAEA"
| scope="row" text-align:center | 2011
| 
| 38 || 0 || – || – || – || – || – || – || – || – || – || – || – || – || – || – || – || –
|-
| scope="row" text-align:center | 2012
| 
| 38 || 0 || – || – || – || – || – || – || – || – || – || – || – || – || – || – || – || –
|- style="background:#EAEAEA"
| scope="row" text-align:center | 2013
| 
| 38 || 6 || 9 || 8 || 29 || 14 || 43 || 16 || 11 || 28 || 1.5 || 1.3 || 4.8 || 2.3 || 7.2 || 2.7 || 1.8 || 4.7
|-
| scope="row" text-align:center | 2014
| 
| 38 || 8 || 6 || 10 || 35 || 24 || 59 || 20 || 27 || 54 || 0.8 || 1.3 || 4.4 || 3.0 || 7.4 || 2.5 || 3.4 || 6.8
|- style="background:#EAEAEA"
| scope="row" text-align:center | 2015
| 
| 38 || 2 || 2 || 0 || 8 || 3 || 11 || 4 || 10 || 29 || 1.0 || 0.0 || 4.0 || 1.5 || 5.5 || 2.0 || 5.0 || 14.5
|-
| scope="row" text-align:center | 2016
| 
| 38 || 9 || 9 || 12 || 52 || 34 || 86 || 34 || 28 || 72 || 1.0 || 1.3 || 5.8 || 3.8 || 9.6 || 3.8 || 3.1 || 8.0
|- style="background:#EAEAEA"
| scope="row" text-align:center | 2017
| 
| 38 || 7 || 4 || 3 || 28 || 20 || 48 || 17 || 23 || 112 || 0.6 || 0.4 || 4.0 || 2.9 || 6.9 || 2.4 || 3.3 || 16.0
|-
| scope="row" text-align:center | 2018
| 
| 1 || 18 || 10 || 4 || 135 || 81 || 216 || 95 || 44 || 87 || 0.6 || 0.2 || 7.5 || 4.5 || 12.0 || 5.3 || 2.4 || 4.8
|- style="background:#EAEAEA"
| scope="row" text-align:center | 2019
| 
| 1 || 0 || – || – || – || – || – || – || – || – || – || – || – || – || – || – || – || –
|-
| scope="row" text-align:center | 2020
| 
| 1 || 4 || 3 || 1 || 17 || 18 || 35 || 9 || 8 || 23 || 0.8 || 0.3 || 4.3 || 4.5 || 8.8 || 2.3 || 2.0 || 5.8
|- style="background:#EAEAEA"
| scope="row" text-align:center | 2021
| 
| 28 || 0 || – || – || – || – || – || – || – || – || – || – || – || – || – || – || – || –
|-
| scope="row" text-align:center | 2022
| 
| 28 || 0 || – || – || – || – || – || – || – || – || – || – || – || – || – || – || – || –
|-  style="background:#EAEAEA; font-weight:bold; width:2em"
| scope="row" text-align:center class="sortbottom" colspan=3 | Career
| 54
| 43
| 38
| 304
| 194
| 498
| 195
| 151
| 405
| 0.8
| 0.7
| 5.6
| 3.6
| 9.2
| 3.6
| 2.8
| 7.5
|}

Personal life
On 1 July 2014, Daw was charged with three counts of rape relating to an alleged sexual assault incident in Altona North in 2007. He had been previously arrested and interviewed over the allegations in May 2014. Daw denied the allegations, while North Melbourne stated that he would remain available for selection. On 3 December 2015, Daw was found not guilty on all counts.

Motorists on the bridge raised the alarm around 11 pm and he was recovered from the river by police and paramedics. He suffered broken hips and pelvis. Daw made his AFL return on 1 August 2020 in a win against , kicking one goal.

References

External links

 "Majak makes history" – from the Australian Broadcasting Corporation's The 7.30 Report

1991 births
Living people
VFL/AFL players born outside Australia
North Melbourne Football Club players
Australian rules footballers from Melbourne
Sudanese emigrants to Australia
Sportspeople of South Sudanese descent
Dinka people
Western Jets players
South Sudanese refugees
Sudanese refugees
People from Khartoum
Werribee Football Club players
South Sudanese players of Australian rules football
Refugees in Egypt
People from Werribee, Victoria